Sexorcism may refer to:

Sexorcism (Lordi album), 2018
Sexorcism (Brooke Candy album), 2019

See also
The Sexorcist (film)
Exorcism (disambiguation)